Larry Johnson is an American former professional wrestler better known as Sonny King. He competed in the World Wide Wrestling Federation (WWWF), where he won the WWWF Tag Team Championship.

Professional wrestling career
Johnson began his career as a professional boxer, but later turned to professional wrestling after befriending Ernie Ladd. Johnson initially turned down the offer from Jack Britton to join the sport, but later tried it anyway. He began his training in Detroit. He later worked in Pittsburgh and Ontario.

In 1972, he teamed with Chief Jay Strongbow to win the World Wide Wrestling Federation's World Tag Team Championship from Baron Mikel Scicluna and King Curtis Iaukea. After a month, they lost the title to the team of Professor Tanaka and  Mr. Fuji. Through 1973 and 1974, he worked in NWA Mid Atlantic where he most often fought Johhny Valentine and Swede Hanson.

Johnson won the NWA Alabama Heavyweight Championship in Alabama in March 1977. In 1978 and 1979, Johnson worked in Memphis as a manager to Jos Leduc and Ron Bass. He also feuded with Jerry Lawler for the Southern Championship. While with Championship Wrestling from Florida, he traded the Florida version of the NWA Brass Knuckles Championship with Killer Karl Kox.

While partnering with The Angel in the Continental Wrestling Association in 1980, he won the AWA Southern Tag Team Championship. While waiting for a card to start in the Carolinas, he noticed a male force his way into an arena past an elderly security guard. When Johnson confronted the man, he was stabbed numerous times, during which he suffered a punctured lung and the knife knicked his heart. Johnson was rushed into emergency surgery. Years later, Johnson recounted the surgeon having to massage his heart outside of his body to keep him alive. He retired in the mid-1980s.

Personal life
Johnson grew up in North Carolina. After retiring from wrestling, he worked in a junkyard in South Florida, buying and selling car parts. His son played football for the South Carolina Gamecocks.

Championships and accomplishments
Championship Wrestling from Florida
NWA Brass Knuckles Championship (Florida version) (1 time)

Continental Wrestling Association
AWA Southern Tag Team Championship (2 times) - with Ricky Morton (1) and The Angel (1)

Southeastern Championship Wrestling
NWA Alabama Heavyweight Championship (1 time)
NWA Gulf Coast Tag Team Championship (1 time) - with Eddie Sullivan

International Wrestling Association
IWA Brass Knuckles Championship (1 time) 

World Wide Wrestling Federation
WWWF World Tag Team Championship (1 time) - with Chief Jay Strongbow

References

External links
Sonny King Profile at Online World of Wrestling
Sonny King Profile at Cagematch

African-American male professional wrestlers
American male professional wrestlers
Living people
Professional wrestlers from North Carolina
1945 births
21st-century African-American people
20th-century African-American sportspeople
20th-century professional wrestlers
NWA Brass Knuckles Champions (Florida version)